Aquil Hashim Abdullah (born Aquil ibn Michael X. Shumate; June 20, 1973) is an American rower who was the first African-American male to qualify for the Summer Olympics in the sport of rowing. He was the first African-American rower to win the Diamond Sculls race at the Henley Royal Regatta in 2000. He was also the first African-American male to win a rowing national championship in 1996, when he won the single sculls competition. He attended George Washington University. He co-authored a book with Chris Ingraham titled Perfect Balance in 2001, after his failure to qualify for the 2000 Summer Olympics.

Rowing career
Abdullah won the silver medal in the single sculls at the 1999 Pan-American Games. In 2000 he missed qualifying for the Summer Olympic Games in Sydney, Australia by 0.33 of a second. He was also the single sculls winner in the 2002 United States national rowing championship.  Abdullah won the Diamond Sculls race at the Henley Regatta in 2000. He defeated Simon Goodbrand by two-thirds of a boat length. Abdullah was a member of the U.S. 2001 World Championship Rowing Team.

2004 Summer Olympics 
Abdullah paired with US Navy Officer Henry Nuzum for the 2004 Qualified Olympic Small Boat Trials in Windsor, NJ. Their qualifying time was 6:23.59. Abdullah and Nuzum were also the first American men to qualify for the Olympic final in double sculls for twenty years.

At the 2004 Summer Olympics, Abdullah and Nuzum finished sixth in their race, 3.93 seconds slower that the bronze medal pace.

Personal life 
Abdullah was born in Washington, DC, on June 20, 1973. Abdullah currently resides in Boston, Massachusetts, where he works as a software engineer. He attended Woodrow Wilson High School in Northwest Washington, D.C.. Woodrow Wilson is the only public school in DC with a rowing program. He played on the football team, but began rowing in his senior year. He took a rowing scholarship to George Washington University and attended from 1992-1996. He majored in physics. He also plays the saxophone.

He was born with the name Aquil ibn Michael X. Shumate. When his father, Michael Shumate, converted to Islam when Aquil was 6, he changed his last name to Abdullah. However, he is now Catholic.

Abdullah worked with a program in Boston named Mandela Crew. Mandela Crew is a program aimed at exposing minority youths from Roxbury to the sport of rowing.

References

External links
 
 
 

1973 births
Living people
American male rowers
African-American sportsmen
Olympic rowers of the United States
Rowers at the 2004 Summer Olympics
Pan American Games medalists in rowing
Pan American Games silver medalists for the United States
Rowers at the 1999 Pan American Games
Woodrow Wilson High School (Washington, D.C.) alumni
African-American Catholics
21st-century African-American sportspeople
20th-century African-American sportspeople
Stewards of Henley Royal Regatta
Medalists at the 1999 Pan American Games
20th-century African-American people